The 2020–21 Turkish Women's Volleyball League is the 39th volleyball tournament year and the top-level women's volleyball tournament of the newly branded and reorganized Turkish Women's Volleyball League. The winner, runner-up and third of Turkish Women's Volleyball League will play in CEV Champions League league round and 4th place will play in CEV Cup main phase. The 5th place will play in CEV Challenge Cup main phase while the last 2 teams in the Turkish Women's Volleyball League will be relegated to the Second League. The last season's champion is VakıfBank, who have won the league 12 times.

Clubs

Personnel

Foreign players
The number of foreign players is morethan to one per club but still in the field not more than 3.

Transfer players

League table

Play-offs

Play-offs 1-4

References

External links

Turkish Women's Volleyball League
Turkish Women's Volleyball League
2020 in Turkish sport
2021 in Turkish sport
2020–21 in European volleyball leagues
Turkish Women's Volleyball League seasons